Dehlor or Deh Lor or Dehlar or Deh-e Lor may refer to:
 Dehlor, Isfahan
 Dehlor, Kermanshah
 Deh Lor, Kermanshah